The Drakes River is a  long stream located in southeastern New Hampshire in the United States. It is a tributary of the Taylor River, a tidal inlet (via the Hampton River) of the Atlantic Ocean.

The river rises in an office park just southeast of the Interstate 95/NH 101 interchange in Hampton, New Hampshire. It flows south, through Coffin Pond, and reaches the Taylor River just west of the Route 1 crossing of the Hampton saltmarsh.

See also

List of rivers of New Hampshire

References

Rivers of New Hampshire
Rivers of Rockingham County, New Hampshire